O'Dwyers GAA is a Gaelic Athletic Association club based at Hamlet Lane, Balbriggan, County Dublin, Ireland, serving the communities of Balbriggan, Balrothery, Balscadden and surrounding areas. Its principal grounds are at Bremore Park, but it also has grounds at Bells Field, Balbriggan, opposite the club house.

The club operates a "skills camp" on a Saturday morning for five- to eight-year-olds, indoors during winter. The club plays football at U-8 (mixed), U-9 (mixed), U-10 (mixed), U11(mixed), U-12 (boys) and U-14 (boys). Girls football is played at U-13, U-14 and U-15. Hurling is catered for ages U-8 (mixed), U9 (mixed), U-10 (boys), U-12 (boys) and U-14 (boys). There is a juvenile camogie team, aimed at girls aged 10/12 years old. There has been some success at juvenile level, with league and cup wins.

At adult level the club has one football team competing in AFL5 and the Dublin Intermediate Football Championship and one Junior hurling team (AHL9).

The club also has a culture club and for part of the year, adults and juvenile members learn set-dancing on a Monday night. Also during the week, tin-whistle and fiddle classes take place in the club house.

History
 The initial discussions to form a new Gaelic Football Club GAA, in Balbriggan, were held under the railway viaduct in Quay Street during the latter half of 1917, at a time when the previous Gaelic football team, Wanderers was dying off. Following these discussions, there was enough interest to form a club which was affiliated to the GAA as O’Dwyer's GFC, on 26 March 1918 and given permission to play in the Minor and Junior Championships. While there are claims that the club was named after the United Irishman Michael Dwyer, it took its name from Bishop Edward Thomas O’Dwyer, who died in August 1917. Bishop O’Dwyer, whose motto was Virtutio non armis fido – I trust to virtue not to arms, became a hero among Irish nationalists, after the 1916 rebellion, when he wrote and published, a strongly worded letter of condemnation against British repression, to General Sir John Maxwell. The creation of another team, by the young men in the Pioneer Total Abstinence Society, however, caused a great rivalry that would last until the Pioneers declined in the middle of the century.

The newly formed club's first match was played in Gormanston, on the field which goes down to the railway station. After that, the club played on Reynold's Field at the Rope Walk, (where Balbriggan Community College is now located), with the entrance being between the present day telephone exchange building and McLoughlin's garage. The Pioneers played on land that was formally a part of Hamlet's farm, given to the GAA for recreational purposes; when the Pioneers declined it was then passed on to O’Dwyers by the GAA.

The strength of the club at this stage is clear by its speedy progress to Intermediate League winners in 1924 to gain Senior Status, followed in 1927 by winning the Dublin Senior League. The club's strength was again shown in this period, with three-in-a-row wins at the Kells Tournament against teams from Meath GAA, Dublin GAA, Louth GAA and Cavan GAA.

In the same years, one member of the club showed speed in a different way, and in a different discipline, when he won an individual All-Ireland title and medal in Croke Park in September 1926. The report from the Drogheda Independent of 26 September states: In Croke Park, on Saturday last the Youth's Half-Mile Championship of Ireland was won from a large and classy field by a Balbriggan youth, Edward (Teddy) Curtis, son of Mr Jas Curtis, Balbriggan, himself a well-known athlete in the old days. Curtis, who is a member of O’Dwyers G.F.C., deserves the hearty congratulations of his fellow townspeople on his striking achievement.
Teddy subsequently ran for Dublin City Harriers, but his win is interesting not merely because he was the first All-Ireland medalist for the club, but also because it highlights, lest one forgets, that in the early days of the GAA, the A really did mean Athletics, in its broadest sense.

The club lost its senior status in the 1930s and struggled to maintain its initial momentum. In the 1940/41 season, after a fight at a match in Croke Park, the club was suspended for five years, and for some time there was no football played. Fortunately, a new young curate, Fr. McCarthy, came to the parish, and he was persuaded to write a letter to the county board complaining that, without any sporting outlet or leisure activity, many young men in the parish were spending all their time in the pubs. On foot of his letter, the county board reversed its decision and reinstated the club. As a result of this upset, the early 40s were lean years for football in the club. Meanwhile, other things were happening.

By 1945, a demand, driven initially by Don Cotter, for the establishment of a hurling team, was gathering support. At the 1946 AGM, the president Tom Reynolds proposed that to defray the cost that a hurling team would incur, the club should form a dramatic society and produce a play for the public. The play, Professor Tim, was performed in the old Town Hall and was a huge success. It was produced by Declan White, with Don Cotter as Professor Tim and Eileen Callaghan and Josie Cunningham in the female roles. After this, there was a play every year, with the society eventually evolving into the present-day Balbriggan Dramatic Society. It was also decided, at this time, to have a competition to name the new hurling team. The influence of two Munster members of the team carried the day with their suggestion of Dál Cáis, fighting off another popular proposal, Balbriggan Slashers. (It is important to remember that, as O’Dwyers was a football club, hurling could not be played using that name, even though it was played by O’Dwyers members on O’Dwyers pitch. GFC meant Gaelic Football, and hurling (and camogie) was another discipline). The team won the Dublin Junior C League and the Balbriggan Feis Competition in 1949 and the Junior B League, Miller Shield and the Feis Tournament in 1950.

The Dál Cáis team lasted ten years, until 1956, but by then the lean years of football had passed, whether because of the new focus that playing hurling and football gave to Gaelic sport, because of burgeoning natural talent of players like the Bell brothers, Phil, Johnny and Tommy, or by a combination of both, is impossible to say, but the comeback started in 1947 when the Rowan Cup was won. This winning team formed the nucleus of the 1st team that won the Junior Championship in 1950 and, subsequently, the Intermediate Championship, in 1956, to regain Senior Status.

Around the end of the 1950s, Pioneers team was going downhill and the pitch at Bremore eventually passed into the hands of O’Dwyers. The old wooden railings surrounding the pitch had rotted by this time and the first task was to replace them with the posts made of concrete and the railings made of gun-barrel tubing, which exist to this day. At this stage, there was no club house but plans to build a pavilion were eventually made, much fundraising carried out, and the foundations finally dug by hand, by two or three club members, and for the first time, O’Dwyers had a permanent structure as its home, albeit a small one. Because the money ran out before the toilets and showers were fitted, these came later, piece-meal. This older structure was by the 1980s inadequate for the club's needs and plans to redevelop and extend it was drawn up and permission obtained to start work which included two new dressing rooms, a committee room, and a complete renovation of the interior to facilitate a larger function room with bar. The building was officially reopened on 27 September 1992 by then GAA president Peter Quinn. The building costs were eased by Bond donations from members, refunded as time elapsed and finances allowed – a plaque engraved with the names of those Bond members is still displayed inside the main door.

The dance floor in the clubhouse enabled the club to organise social and fund-raising events, but, undoubtedly, one of the most important results of a bigger space was the vibrancy that it gave to the still embryonic set dancing group, which later became the Céili group and is now the Culture Group. Set dancing today is synonymous with O’Dwyer's Culture Group with the Tony McNulty and Eithne O’Donnell nights being important annual events in the club's social calendar. The group also participates in the Scór competitions and organises fiddle and tin whistle classes.
On the field of play, the club continued to build steadily, on the football successes of the 50s, and, in 1970, won the Dublin Senior League. These were heady days for the club, and while senior status was eventually lost, as the century drew to a close, the first team won Senior 2 League in 1980, and other teams won the Junior C Championship in 2002, Junior 5 & 6 Leagues in 2001 and 2002, and were Division 10 winners in 2013.

As for hurling, it made a brief resurgence in the late 1960s. Then, in the 1980s at a time, when Parish Leagues were in vogue, a group of hurling enthusiasts met in The Milestone Pub and from that meeting O’Dwyers Hurlers were formed, and in September 1986, the club executive decided to affiliate a junior hurling team to the Junior D League. At the beginning, it was difficult, because football was always the greater lure but gradually, the steady stream from a new growing juvenile section provided an upward progression from U12s to enable, in time, the formation of a Minor and U21 team.

his continuous upward movement was further facilitated by the introduction of hurling into three of the town's primary schools with the help of Declan Power, a Leinster Council GAA coach. The first success came in 1992/3 with the winning of the D League and The Fletcher Shield, followed by the C League and The Miller Shield in 93/94. The following year a runners-up position in the B League resulted in a promotion to the A-League. Hurling continues to hold its place in the club both at adult and juvenile sections

Camogie also advanced in the middle years of the century. While there had been camogie in the earlier years, the 40s, 50s and 60s was the era of St Molaga's Camogie team. St Molaga's played in the Dublin League but the highlight of these early years was the annual Balbriggan Féis match against Skerries. After a lapse in the 60s, camogie made a temporary comeback in the 90s, with teams from U11 to Junior, and then again in the 2000s with both juvenile and adult teams. Whilst there is no camogie at present there is every hope that, with the increase in popularity of, and interest in, Gaelic games among ladies and young girls camogie will soon make a comeback.

The growth of the town and the awareness that the future of any club rests on the vibrancy of its juvenile section led in the first years of the new millennium to a determined effort to attract, and hold onto, new blood. A 2020 Vision strategy was devised in 2001, to lay the foundations of what, it was hoped, would become, by 2020, a broad-bottomed pyramid-shaped Club structure, that grew organically from the nursery, through all grades, to senior. The plan, which was devised and completed within six months, drew on the energies and loyalty of the adult section, past and present, who volunteered to visit every house in the town, visit every school to promote the club; leaflets and letters were given to parents through the schools, endorsing the importance and advantages of sport in the growth and health of young people. The results were seen immediately in the Saturday morning nursery, where the expertise and vision of Ger Lyons and his, by then, an expanded retinue of adult members/coaches, provided an ideal introduction to the club to new children and their parents. Added to this, the juvenile committee was given greater responsibilities in the organisation and recruitment of juvenile teams, players and mentors. For the Executive, aware of the importance of a presence in all the schools, the decision to employ the club's first Games Promotion Officer was a natural, if expensive, step to take. The rewards of all the hard work, at this time, and since, can be seen in the 31 teams now fielded across 10 age groups from U7 to Adult, in Ladies Football, Football and Hurling.
In tandem with this, the growth of Ladies Football in the club has been and continues to be, the success story of the new millennium, with teams at all levels winning leagues and championships and players representing Dublin at minor, junior and senior level.

Club Development
 In recent times the club has been working hard to keep pace with a 120% increase in population (23,000) and has faced strong competition from neighbouring sporting clubs within the area. This expansion has, however, brought its own new challenges. The management of such a big club is like managing a huge machine with multiple moving parts needing constant maintenance and attention, to make it work properly, effectively and efficiently.  Updating of personnel, equipment, skills and ideas is constant, just as the need for successful fund-raising is a never-ending trial.

The most immediate concern is that the club's facilities are insufficient to cope with the needs of so many teams playing matches and are restricting the club from reaching its full potential. A single pitch, which originally catered for a single football team in the 1920s, is no longer enough. Since the late 1990s, attempts have been made to relocate to a larger site, with more pitches and better facilities. Several projects have fallen through, mainly due to the economic downturn. While the new Fingal County Council All Weather Pitch, shared and co-managed with Balbriggan FC, helps protect the main pitch to some extent, the club urgently needs more space, more land, more pitches, more dressing rooms, and a larger clubhouse. These are imperatives to cater for all the sporting and holistic needs of the club members and to allow present and future generations benefit fully from all that a vibrant GAA Club can offer – not just in Sport and Gaelic traditions, but also in creating well-rounded individuals who we hope will be the future members, leaders and role models in our community.

To meet the future requirements of the club, they have worked with Fingal County Council on a project that will see the club move to a new facility at Bremore Regional Park. Under the agreement, Fingal County Council will enter into a long-term lease with O’Dwyers for a 10-acre site on the northern boundary of the park where the club will develop a new clubhouse, sports pitch, parking and training areas which will be in alignment with and complementary to the council's overall vision for the park. The council has also agreed to purchase O’Dwyers’ current facility at Hamlet Lane which it will be used for road improvements in the area as well as providing new housing.

Following member approval, the club submitted a Planning Application to the council for a new development that consists of:

New Clubhouse/Sportshall building to include:
Ground Floor: Sportshall, Changing Facilities, Toilets, Stores, Club Shop, plant room
First Floor: Clubhouse Bar & associated facilities, balcony, multi-function room and two meeting rooms
Formation and construction of two natural-surface GAA playing pitches (1 full-size floodlit pitch and 1 training/junior size pitch, each with associated ball-stop netting.
One detached field maintenance shed and one external equipment building (incl. generator).
Hurling wall & associated floodlighting and enclosure fencing.
New vehicular & pedestrian entrance gates, piers & railings (off R132); new bicycle & car parking.
All associated drainage (incl. foul pump station & surface-water attenuation tank), site development works, services, perimeter fencing and landscape work.

Roll of Honour
 Dublin Intermediate Football Championship: Winners 1956
 Dublin Junior Football Championship: Winners 1950, 2020
 Dublin Junior C Football Championship Winners 2002
 Dublin AFL Division 1: Winners 1970
 Dublin AFL Div. 10: Winners 2013
 Dublin Junior B Hurling Championship: Winners 2006
 Dublin Junior C Hurling Championship Winners 2003

Notable players
 John O'Leary, former Dublin inter-county footballer
 Stephen Rooney, former Dublin inter-county footballer
 George Wilson, former Dublin inter-county footballer

External links
O'Dwyers GAA Club
Official Dublin GAA Website
GAA Website

References

Gaelic games clubs in Fingal
Gaelic football clubs in Fingal
Hurling clubs in Fingal
Balbriggan